Academy SC is a Cayman Islands football club based in George Town which currently plays in Cayman Islands Premier League.

Academy Sports Club is a registered non-profit football club. Their aim is to provide quality football development to the youth of the Cayman Islands, while emphasizing academic excellence and providing opportunity for the development of personal character and civic responsibility.

The club motto “The Books and the Ball You’ve Got it All” combines excellence in youth football development with an environment that emphasizes academic success.

Honours:

CIFA Fosters First Division:   
Champions 2014–15

Cayman Islands FA Cup:
Runner-up 2016–17

Runners-up 2020-2021

 Cayman Islands Vice-President Cup:

Champions 2021-2022

Current roster

See also
 caymanactive.com

References

Football clubs in the Cayman Islands